Mayra Alejandra “China” Jordán (born 2 July 1994) is a Panamanian footballer who plays as a midfielder. She has been a member of the Panama women's national team.

International career
Jordán capped for Panama at senior level during the 2013 Central American Games.

See also
 List of Panama women's international footballers

References

1994 births
Living people
Panamanian women's footballers
Women's association football midfielders
Panama women's international footballers
Central American Games competitors for Panama